was an old province of Japan on Tsushima Island which occupied the area corresponding to modern-day Tsushima, Nagasaki. It was sometimes called  .

Political history
The origin of Tsushima Province is unclear. It is possible that Tsushima was recognized as a province of the Yamato Court in the 5th century. Under the Ritsuryō system, Tsushima formally became a province.

Tsushima Province has been a strategic area that took a major role in the national defense against possible invasions from the continent and in trade with Korea. After Japan was defeated by Tang dynasty at the Battle of Baekgang in 663, Kaneda Castle was constructed on this island.

Tsushima Province had been controlled by the Tsushima no Kuni no miyatsuko until the Heian period. This clan was later replaced by the Abiru clan. The Sō clan rose to power around the middle 13th century and seized control of the entire island in the late 15th century. During the Edo period, Tsushima Province was dominated by the Tsushima-Fuchū Domain (Izuhara domain) of the So clan. It was put in charge of diplomacy and monopolized trade with the Joseon dynasty of Korea.

As a result of the abolition of the han system, the Tsushima Fuchu domain became Izuhara Prefecture in 1871. In the same year, Izuhara Prefecture was merged into Imari Prefecture, which was renamed Saga Prefecture in 1872. Tsushima was transferred to Nagasaki Prefecture in 1872.  At the same time, the province continued to exist for some purposes.  For example, Tsushima is explicitly recognized in treaties in 1894 (a) between Japan and the United States and (b) between Japan and the United Kingdom.

Historical districts
Throughout history, Tsushima Province consisted of two districts:
 Nagasaki Prefecture
 Kamiagata District (上県郡)
 Shimoagata District (下県郡)

The capital of Tsushima Province was located at Izuhara. In the modern local municipality system, they were divided into Kamiagata and Shimoagata Districts respectively, and were subsequently merged into the city of Tsushima today.

See also
 Tsushima-Fuchū Domain

Notes

References
 Nussbaum, Louis-Frédéric and Käthe Roth. (2005).  Japan encyclopedia. Cambridge: Harvard University Press. ;  OCLC 58053128
 Papinot, Edmond. (1910). Historical and Geographic Dictionary of Japan. Tokyo: Librarie Sansaisha. OCLC 77691250

External links 

  Murdoch's map of provinces, 1903
  Tsuikai Kingdom by 魏志倭人
  Tsushima in the Wa people chronicles

Former provinces of Japan